Jean-Élie Bédéno Dejaure (1766, Paris – 5 October 1799) was an 18th-century French playwright. His son, Jean-Claude Bédéno Dejaure, called Dejaure fils was also a playwright.

Life 
When he presented his first plays to the Italian actors, for them to treat him with some respect, Dejaure had added the title "Baron" to his name, although he was the son of a merchant. But after his early success, he renounced this title, which he no longer needed. From 1789 to 1795, he gave the Comédie-Italienne as well as the Théâtre-Français, eighteen theatre plays, comedies, operas and opéras comiques (including several with Rodolphe Kreutzer), of little invention but interesting, with dramatic effects and morality, which have been successful for most of them.

Main works 
1789: Les Époux réunis, one-act comedy, in verse
1790: Ferdinand ou la Suite des Deux Pages, one-act opéra comique  
1791: Lodoïska ou les Tartares, three-act opéra-comique, music by Rodolphe Kreutzer 
1791: Louise de Valsan, three-act comedy 
1791: L’Incertitude maternelle ou la Chose impossible, comedy in one act and in verse 
1791: Le Franc-Breton ou le Négociant de Nantes, comedy in one act and in verse, later transformed into an opéra comique on a music by Kreutzer 
1796: Imogène ou la Gageure indiscrète, opéra comique in three acts and in verse imitated from Cymbeline by Shakespeare  
1798: La Dot de Suzette, one-act opéra comique mingled with ariettes, music by François-Adrien Boïeldieu 
1798: Les Quiproquos espagnols, two-act opera with ariettes, music by Devienne 
1799: Montano et Stéphanie, three-act opéra comique, music by Henri Montan Berton 
1801: Astyanax, three-act opéra comique, music by Kreutzer.

References

Sources 
 Ferdinand Hoefer, Nouvelle Biographie générale, t.XIII, Paris, Firmin-Didot, 1866, (p. 375-6).

External links 
 Jean-Élie Bédéno Dejaure on CÉSAR
 Jean-Élie Bédéno Dejaure on Data.bnf.fr

Writers from Paris
18th-century French dramatists and playwrights
1761 births
1799 deaths